Albert Nuss (28 February 1907 – 14 July 1969) was a Luxembourgian boxer. He competed in the men's welterweight event at the 1928 Summer Olympics.

References

1907 births
1969 deaths
Luxembourgian male boxers
Olympic boxers of Luxembourg
Boxers at the 1928 Summer Olympics
Sportspeople from Luxembourg City
Welterweight boxers